Zhang Shuai was a three-time defending champion, having won the previous editions from 2015 to 2017 and successfully defended her title, defeating Jasmine Paolini in the final, 6–3, 7–5.

Seeds

Draw

Finals

Top half

Bottom half

References

Main Draw

Ando Securities Open - Singles